Saint Anne's Hill Historic District is part of the Historic Inner East neighborhood in Dayton, Ohio, United States. St. Anne's Hill constitutes a grouping of both vernacular and high style Victorian residences which date roughly from 1860 to the early 20th century. Having originally been platted in 1802 by German immigrants, the neighborhood is significant for its German heritage. Stivers School for the Arts is located within St. Anne's Hill.

Historic District
The area was first recognized by the city as a local historical neighborhood in 1974, via City of Dayton Ordinance #24688. St. Anne's Hill was registered on the National Register of Historic Places (No. 86001214) in 1986. The designated area is bounded by Fourth, McClure, Josie, and High and Dutoit Streets. The historic district consists of roughly 14 blocks, containing 333 properties as of 2014.

Architecture

The architecture of St. Anne's Hill Historic District includes examples of Second Empire, Romanesque and Queen Anne. Notable buildings include The Steamboat House at 6 Josie Street and the Bossler Mansion (built in 1869) at 136 S. Dutoit Street. Every other year, the neighborhood runs tours of historic homes, with guides in Victorian costumes, to raise funds for the local historic society.

Parks
Bomberger Park is a notable feature of St. Anne's Hill. During the Great Dayton Flood of 1913, boats were docked in Bomberger Park with evacuees. In the 1930s, the park featured a notable wading pool with a colonnade, though none of these structures now exist. The park now contains tennis and basketball courts, a baseball diamond, soccer field and playground. In 2012, the City of Dayton sold the adjacent Bomberger Center (constructed in 1956) to the Ahiska Turkish American Community Center of Dayton.

There are also several other parks inside the district including Fred's Park, Alice's Park, Terry Street Park, and Victorian Park.

Businesses
Since 2013, St. Anne's Hill has seen increasing numbers of small businesses opening on 5th Street. Fifth Street Brewpub, a co-op pub, opened in 2013, and is credited with establishing the area as a viable business destination. Gem City Catfé, a cat café with coffee, wine, and adoptable cats, opened in January 2018. It was followed by the antique store Harry's Collection in March 2018, and the bakery and café St. Anne's the Tart in 2019.

See also
National Register of Historic Places listings in Dayton, Ohio

References

External links
 St. Anne's Hill Historic District
 Preservation Dayton
 St. Anne's Hill on Dayton MostMetro
 City of Dayton's official website

National Register of Historic Places in Montgomery County, Ohio
Historic districts on the National Register of Historic Places in Ohio
Neighborhoods in Dayton, Ohio